Holmview railway station is located on the Beenleigh line in Queensland, Australia. It is one of two stations serving the Logan suburb of Beenleigh, the other being Beenleigh station.

History
Holmview station opened in 1885 as Holme View. It was named Holme View because it had a view of the Loganholme area. The station was renamed Holmview shortly afterwards. On 21 April 1992, a second platform opened as part of the duplication of the line.

Services
Holmview station is served by all stops Beenleigh line services from Beenleigh to Bowen Hills and Ferny Grove.

Services by platform

References

External links

Holmview station Queensland Rail
Holmview station Queensland's Railways on the Internet
[ Holmview station] TransLink travel information

Railway stations in Australia opened in 1885
Railway stations in Logan City